Fairmont Downtown Historic District is a national historic district located at Fairmont, Marion County, West Virginia.  The district includes 97 contributing buildings and two contributing structures in Fairmont's central business district. They are in a variety of late 19th- and early 20th-century architectural styles. Notable buildings include the Watson Building (1909-1911), U.S. Court House and Post Office (1940), Monongahela Valley Traction Freight House (1927), the Jacobs and Hutchinson complex, and the Library (1914).  The Marion County Courthouse and Sheriff's House and Robert H. Mollohan-Jefferson Street Bridge are located in the district and listed separately on the National Register of Historic Places.

It was listed on the National Register of Historic Places in 1995.

References

Historic districts in Marion County, West Virginia
Buildings and structures in Marion County, West Virginia
National Register of Historic Places in Marion County, West Virginia
Historic districts on the National Register of Historic Places in West Virginia